En Vivo Desde Hollywood (Eng.: "Live from Hollywood")  is a live album by Regional Mexican singer Jenni Rivera, released on April 4, 2006. It was recorded in Los Angeles, California.

Track listing

Chart performance

References

2006 live albums
Jenni Rivera live albums
Fonovisa Records live albums
Spanish-language live albums
Jenni Rivera video albums